Saint Andrew's is the largest parish in Grenada. The main town is Grenville, which is also Grenada's second largest town after St George's. Grenville is also known as La Baye (its former French name).

History
In the 1650s the French named the parish  Morne de Combat  and it was part of the French Territories.
Marquis was the first Parish Capital from 1795 to 1796, Grenville became capital of Saint Andrew's in 1796.

Towns 
Chutz
Clabony
Dunfermline
Grenville
Mamma Cannes
Marquis
Morne Docteur
Paraclete
Soubise
Tivoli
Union Village
Upper Capitol
Upper Conference
Upper Pearls
Harford Village
Cook Hill
Gram Bras
Mt. Horne 
La. Fillete 
Paradise

References

Parishes of Grenada